Gottfried Weilenmann (29 March 1920 – 14 November 2018) was a Swiss cyclist. Professional 1945 to 1952, he won the Tour de Suisse in 1949 and the Swiss National Road Race Championships in 1952. In the latter year, he placed second in the UCI World Road Racing Championships road behind Heinz Müller.

His brother Leo was also a professional rider during the same period as he was. His father, Gottfried was part of the Swiss team pursuit at the 1924 Olympic Games.

Major results

1942
 1st  Road race, National Amateur Road Championships
1944
 2nd À Travers Lausanne
1945
 2nd Overall Circuito del Norte
 2nd À Travers Lausanne
 3rd Tour du Lac Léman
1946
 2nd Overall Volta a Catalunya
 3rd Zurich–Lausanne
1947
 8th Overall Tour de Romandie
 10th GP du Midi Libre
1949
 1st  Overall Tour de Suisse
 2nd Giro del Ticino
 2nd Tour du Nord-Ouest de la Suisse
 3rd Züri-Metzgete
1950
 3rd Road race, National Road Championships
1952
 1st  Road race, National Road Championships
 2nd  Road race, UCI Road World Championships
 5th La Flèche Wallonne
 8th Liège–Bastogne–Liège

Grand Tour Results
Source:

Tour de France
1947: 17th
1950: 39th
1950: 50th
1951: 50th
1952: 12th

Giro d'Italia
1950: 45th
1952: 39th

References

1920 births
2018 deaths
Swiss male cyclists
People from Arbon District
Sportspeople from Thurgau